The 1st Pontieri Regiment is an inactive military engineer unit of the Italian Army last based in Legnano in Lombardy. The term "Pontieri" comes from the Italian word for bridge and is used to denote units of the engineer arm tasked with the construction of bridges. Enlisted personnel in such units is addressed by the singular form: "Pontiere". The unit was formed in 1933 as 1st Pontieri Regiment (Light Bridges) and active during World War II. The regiment was disbanded by invading German forces after the announcement of the Armistice of Cassibile on 8 September 1943. In 1992 the unit was reformed as 1st Pontieri Engineer Battalion, which received the flag and traditions of the 1st Pontieri Regiment. The battalion was disbanded in 1995.

History 
On 15 May 1933 the 1st Pontieri Regiment (Light Bridges) was formed in Verona with existing Pontieri and Lagunari units from the disbanded Pontieri and Lagunari Regiment: II Pontieri Battalion in Verona, IV Pontieri Battalion in Rome, and V Lagunari Battalion in Venice. The new regiment formed these units into two Pontieri battalions, with each battalion also fielding two Lagunari companies.

The regiment provided 15 officers and 375 enlisted to fill out units that were deployed for the Second Italo-Ethiopian War in 1935-36. On 1 October 1938 the battalions were reorganized as I Mixed Bridges Battalion and II Mixed Bridges Battalion. Each battalion consisted of two light bridges companies and one heavy bridges company.

With the outbreak of World War II the regiment's depot began to mobilize new units:
 II and XXXIV Pontieri battalions (heavy bridges)
 XV and XVI motorized Pontieri battalions (light truck-transported bridges)
 XVII, XVIII, XIX, XX, XXI, and XXII Pontieri battalions (light bridges)
 IX Pontieri Battalion (one heavy bridges company and one light bridges company)
 and dozens of autonomous Pontieri companies

The IX Pontieri Battalion served on the Eastern Front, where it earned a Silver Medal of Military Valour, while the battalion's 22nd Company was awarded a Bronze Medal of Military Valour for its last stand on the Don. The 1st Pontieri Regiment was disbanded by invading German forces after the announcement of the Armistice of Cassibile on 8 September 1943.

On 22 September 1992 the 1st Pontieri Battalion of the 2nd Pontieri Engineer Regiment in Legnano became an autonomous unit and received the flag and traditions of the 1st Pontieri Regiment. The battalion consisted of a command, a command and services company, three Pontieri companies, and a special equipment company. The battalion was assigned to the Northeastern Military Region. With the end of the Cold War the army began to reduce its forces and the battalion was renamed 5th Engineer Battalion "Bolsena" on 31 August 1995 and the flag of the 1st Pontieri Regiment was returned to the Shrine of the Flags in the Vittoriano in Rome.

References

Engineer Regiments of Italy